The climate of Titan, the largest moon of Saturn, is similar in many respects to that of Earth, despite having a far lower surface temperature. Its thick atmosphere, methane rain, and possible cryovolcanism create an analogue, though with different materials, to the climatic changes undergone by Earth during its far shorter year.

Temperature
Titan receives just about 1% of the amount of sunlight Earth does. The average surface temperature is about 90.6 K (-182.55 °C, or -296.59 °F). At this temperature water ice has an extremely low vapor pressure, so the atmosphere is nearly free of water vapor. However the methane in the atmosphere causes a substantial greenhouse effect which keeps the surface of Titan at a much higher temperature than what would otherwise be the thermal equilibrium.

Haze in Titan's atmosphere contributes to an anti-greenhouse effect by reflecting sunlight back into space, making its surface significantly colder than its upper atmosphere. This partially compensates for the greenhouse warming, and keeps the surface somewhat cooler than would otherwise be expected from the greenhouse effect alone. According to McKay et al., "the anti-greenhouse effect on Titan reduces the surface temperature by 9 K whereas the greenhouse effect increases it by 21 K. The net effect is that the surface temperature (94 K) is 12 K warmer than the effective temperature 82 K. [i.e., the equilibrium that would be reached in the absence of any atmosphere]"

Seasons

Titan's orbital tilt with respect to the sun is very close to Saturn's axial tilt (about 27°), and its axial tilt with respect to its orbit is zero. This means that the direction of incoming sunlight is driven almost entirely by Titan's day-night cycle and Saturn's year cycle. The day cycle on Titan lasts 15.9 Earth days, which is how long it takes Titan to orbit Saturn. Titan is tidally locked, so the same part of Titan always faces Saturn, and there is no separate "month" cycle.

Seasonal change is driven by Saturn's year: it takes Saturn about 29.5 Earth years to orbit the sun, exposing different amounts of sunlight to Titan's northern and southern hemispheres during different parts of the Saturnian year. Seasonal weather changes include larger hydrocarbon lakes in the northern hemisphere during the winter, decreased haze around the equinoxes due to changing atmospheric circulation, and associated ice clouds in the South Polar regions. The last equinox occurred on August 11, 2009; this was the spring equinox for the northern hemisphere, meaning the southern hemisphere is getting less sunlight and moving into winter.

Surface winds are normally low (<1 meter per second). Recent computer simulations indicate that the huge dunes of soot like material raining down from the atmosphere in the equatorial regions may instead be shaped by rare storm winds that happen only every fifteen years when Titan is in equinox. The storms produce strong downdrafts, flowing eastward at up to 10 meters per second when they reach the surface. In late 2010, the equivalent of early Spring in Titan's northern hemisphere, a series of methane storms were observed in Titan's equatorial desert regions.

Due to the eccentricity of Saturn's orbit, Titan is about 12% closer to the sun during the southern hemisphere summer, making southern summers shorter but hotter than northern summers. This asymmetry may contribute to topological differences between the hemispheres - the northern hemisphere has many more hydrocarbon lakes. Titan's lakes are largely placid, with few waves or ripples; however, Cassini has found evidence of increasing turbulence during the northern hemisphere summer, suggesting that surface winds may strengthen during certain times of the Titanian year. Waves and ripples have also been seen by Cassini.

Methane rain and lakes
The findings of the Huygens probe indicate that Titan's atmosphere periodically rains liquid methane and other organic compounds onto the moon's surface. In October 2007, observers noted an increase in apparent opacity in the clouds above the equatorial Xanadu region, suggestive of "methane drizzle", though this was not direct evidence for rain. However, subsequent images of lakes in Titan's southern hemisphere taken over one year show that they are enlarged and filled by seasonal hydrocarbon rainfall. It is possible that areas of Titan's surface may be coated in a layer of tholins, but this has not been confirmed. The presence of rain indicates that Titan may be the only Solar System body besides Earth upon which rainbows could form. However, given the extreme opacity of the atmosphere to visible light, the vast majority of any rainbows would be visible only in the infrared.

The number of methane lakes visible near Titan's south pole is decidedly smaller than the number observed near the north pole. As the south pole is currently in summer and the north pole in winter, an emerging hypothesis is that methane rains onto the poles in winter and evaporates in summer. According to a paper by Tetsuya Tokano of the University of Cologne, cyclones driven by this evaporation and involving rain as well as gale-force winds of up to 20 m/s (45 mph) are expected to form over the large northern seas (Kraken Mare, Ligeia Mare, Punga Mare) only in the northern summer, lasting up to ten days. Calculations suggest that, as the northern hemisphere, where most of the lakes reside, enters the long Titanean summer, wind speeds might increase to 3 km/h, levels sufficient to produce waves. Waves have been observed on several occasions by Cassini RADAR and the Visual and Infrared Mapping Spectrometer since 2014, which were likely generated from summer winds or tidal currents.

Circulation

Simulations of global wind patterns based on wind speed data taken by Huygens during its descent have suggested that Titan's atmosphere circulates in a single enormous Hadley cell. Warm gas rises in Titan's southern hemisphere—which was experiencing summer during Huygens descent—and sinks in the northern hemisphere, resulting in high-altitude gas flow from south to north and low-altitude gas flow from north to south. Such a large Hadley cell is only possible on a slowly rotating world such as Titan. The pole-to-pole wind circulation cell appears to be centered on the stratosphere; simulations suggest it ought to change every twelve years, with a three-year transition period, over the course of Titan's year (30 terrestrial years). This cell creates a global band of low pressure—what is in effect a variation of Earth's Intertropical Convergence Zone (ITCZ). Unlike on Earth, however, where the oceans confine the ITCZ to the tropics, on Titan, the zone wanders from one pole to the other, taking methane rainclouds with it. This means that Titan, despite its frigid temperatures, can be said to have a tropical climate.

In June 2012, Cassini imaged a rotating polar vortex on Titan's southern pole, which the imaging team believe is related to a "polar hood"—an area of dense, high altitude haze seen over the northern pole since the probe's arrival in 2004. As the hemispheres are now switching seasons since the 2009 equinox, with the southern pole entering winter and the north entering summer, it is hypothesised that this vortex could mark the formation of a new, southern polar hood.

Clouds

Titan's clouds, probably composed of methane, ethane, or other simple organics, are scattered and variable, punctuating the overall haze.

In September 2006, Cassini imaged a large cloud at a height of 40 km over Titan's north pole. Although methane is known to condense in Titan's atmosphere, the cloud was more likely to be ethane, as the detected size of the particles was only 1–3 micrometers and ethane can also freeze at these altitudes. In December, Cassini again observed cloud cover and detected methane, ethane and other organics. The cloud was over 2400 km in diameter and was still visible during a following flyby a month later. One hypothesis is that it is currently raining (or, if cool enough, snowing) on the north pole; the downdrafts at high northern latitudes are strong enough to drive organic particles towards the surface. These were the strongest evidence yet for the long-hypothesized "methanological" cycle (analogous to Earth's hydrological cycle) on Titan.

Clouds have also been found over the south polar region. While typically covering 1% of Titan's disk, outburst events have been observed in which the cloud cover rapidly expands to as much as 8%. One hypothesis asserts that the southern clouds are formed when heightened levels of sunlight during the Titanean summer generate uplift in the atmosphere, resulting in convection. This explanation is complicated by the fact that cloud formation has been observed not only post–summer solstice but also at mid-spring. Increased methane humidity at the south pole possibly contributes to the rapid increases in cloud size. There had been summer in Titan's southern hemisphere until 2010, when Saturn's orbit, which governs the moon's motion, tilted the northern hemisphere towards the Sun. When the seasons switch, it is expected that ethane will begin to condense over the south pole.

Research models that match well with observations suggest that clouds on Titan cluster at preferred coordinates and that cloud cover varies by distance from the surface on different parts of the satellite. In the polar regions (above 60 degrees latitude), widespread and permanent ethane clouds appear in and above the troposphere; at lower latitudes, mainly methane clouds are found between 15 and 18 km, and are more sporadic and localized. In the summer hemisphere, frequent, thick but sporadic methane clouds seem to cluster around 40°.

Ground-based observations also reveal seasonal variations in cloud cover. Over the course of Saturn's 30-year orbit, Titan's cloud systems appear to manifest for 25 years, and then fade for four to five years before reappearing again.

Cassini has also detected high-altitude, white, cirrus-type clouds in Titan's upper atmosphere, likely formed of methane.

Although no evidence of lightning activity has yet been observed on Titan, computer models suggest that clouds in the moon's lower troposphere can accumulate enough charge to generate lightning from an altitude of roughly 20 km. The presence of lightning in Titan's atmosphere would favour the production of organic materials. Cassini did not detect any lightning in Titan's atmosphere, though lightning could still be present if it was too weak to be detected. Recent computer simulations have shown that under certain circumstances streamer discharges, the early stages of lightning discharges, may be formable on Titan.

References

Climate
Climate